The Paige Motor Car Co. Building, at 1699 Van Ness Avenue in San Francisco, California, was built in two phases in 1919 and 1922.  It was listed on the National Register of Historic Places in 1983.

It was designed by architect Sylvain Schnaittacher and has been described as having a "granolithic" finish.

References

National Register of Historic Places in San Francisco
Buildings and structures completed in 1919